Jeff Carroll (born January 8, 1984 in Alexandria, Virginia) was an  American soccer player who last played for Real Maryland Monarchs in the USL Second Division in 2009.  In 2014, Jeff joined the DC United Academy as a coach of the U14 team.

Career

College
Carroll attended West Springfield High School, and played college soccer for St. John's University, New York from 2002 to 2005, earning All-Big East Third Team honors during his junior and All-New York Region Third Team and All-Big East Second Team honors as a senior while leading his team to the NCAA Tournament.

During his college years Carroll also played for the Brooklyn Knights in the USL Premier Development League.

Professional
Carroll was selected in the fourth round, 39th overall, of the 2006 MLS SuperDraft by D.C. United, and made his first career MLS start against the New York Red Bulls on September 23, 2006. During his time with DC he was a key member of the club's reserve squad, playing extensively in the MLS Reserve Division, but found first team opportunities difficult to come by, and was dogged by continuous injury problems in 2008.

He was waived by D.C. United on December 1, 2008, and subsequently signed for the Real Maryland Monarchs of the USL Second Division in April, 2009.

Personal
Carroll is the older brother of fellow professional soccer player Pat Carroll and younger brother of fellow professional soccer player Brian Carroll, all of whom played with Jeff at D.C. United.

References

External links

Real Maryland Monarchs bio
MLS player profile
St. Johns bio

1984 births
American soccer players
Brooklyn Knights players
D.C. United players
Real Maryland F.C. players
Living people
Sportspeople from Fairfax County, Virginia
Soccer players from Virginia
St. John's Red Storm men's soccer players
USL League Two players
Major League Soccer players
USL Second Division players
D.C. United draft picks
Association football midfielders